In road and highway construction, a gore (or nose in modern British English) is a triangular plot of land as designated when a road forks at the intersection with second road, or merges on and off from a larger one.  A "virtual" (or theoretical) gore is a triangular shaped space, characteristically marked off with distinguishing highway paint, often found leading to the unpaved area of a larger physical gore.

The term gore (describing a space) is a historic one, representing a characteristically triangular piece of land, often designated incidentally when two surveys failed to meet. Etymologically it is derived from gār, meaning spear. 

A theoretical gore is commonly marked with transverse or chevron painted lines (much as traffic islands) at both entrance and exit ramps.  These help separate drivers on the mainline from those entering and exiting the highway, and also aid the latter category of drivers in regulating their speed while accelerating and decelerating.  Gores at exit ramps occasionally feature impact attenuators, especially when something solid follows the theoretical or physical gore, such as a bridge abutment.

At the "theoretical gore point", a dotted white line becomes a wide solid white channelizing line and another wide solid white line angles off along the edge of the diverging road, forming an elongated white triangle in front of the gore. This as a "neutral area" with white chevron markings optionally added.

See also
 Intersection (road)

References

External links
 

Road infrastructure
Road surface markings

de:Fahrbahnmarkierung#Flächenmarkierungen